River Cracraft (born Tanner Cracraft; November 1, 1994) is an American football wide receiver for the Miami Dolphins of the National Football League (NFL). He played college football at Washington State.

Early life and high school
Cracraft was born in Rancho Santa Margarita, California, and grew up in nearby Trabuco Canyon. He attended Santa Margarita Catholic High School, where he played football and baseball and ran track. In football, he was a four year letter winner and played both wide receiver and defensive back and was named All-State and All-Trinity League in his sophomore season after recording 35 receptions for 469 yards on offense while making 41 tackles with three interceptions on defense. He was named All-State, All-CIF and All-Trinity League as a junior after recording 46 receptions for 654 yards and six touchdowns for the Eagles as the team went on to win the 2011 Division I State Championship. As a senior, Cracraft caught 56 passes for 935 yards and 10 touchdowns and recorded an interception with five pass breakups on defense and was named first-team All-County by the Orange County Register and the Trinity League Offensive Player of the Year. He had a total of 134 receptions while playing for the Eagles, second in school history behind former NFL receiver Brian Finneran, and finished third in school history with 2,043 receiving yards. Rated a three-star prospect by several major recruiting services and the number 91 overall prospect in California by ESPN.com, Cracraft committed to play college football at Washington State over offers from Nevada and UNLV.

College career

Cracraft played four seasons for the Cougars. He appeared in all 13 of the Cougars games as a true freshman, starting 10 and recording 46 receptions for 614 yards and three touchdowns and was named honorable mention All-Pac-12 Conference and honorable mention All-Freshman Team by College Football News. The next year, Cracraft caught 66 passes for 771 yards and eight touchdowns despite missing three games to a stress fracture in his foot. This included a career-high 172 yards and three touchdowns on 11 receptions in a 60-59 loss to California in which Washington State quarterback Connor Halliday passed for an NCAA record 734 yards. The following game, Cracraft set a school record with 14 receptions in a game, along with 100 yards and a touchdown, in a 34-17 loss to Stanford, which was both tied and then broken later in the season by teammate Vince Mayle. 

Cracraft entered his junior season on the 2015 Fred Biletnikoff Award watchlist, but missed three games due to a stress fracture in his opposite foot and finished the year with 53 receptions for 615 yards and four touchdowns. He returned from his injury to play in the 2015 Sun Bowl and caught five passes for 63 yards in the Cougars' 20-14 win over the Miami Hurricanes. Cracraft had 53 receptions, 701 receiving yards and five touchdowns in his senior season and was again named honorable mention All-Pac 12 before tearing his ACL in the tenth game of the season. He recorded 218 receptions (No. 2 in school history behind teammate Gabe Marks), 2,701 receiving yards (6th) and 20 touchdowns (6th) in 42 games played while at Washington State.

Collegiate statistics

Professional career

Denver Broncos
Due to his knee injury, Cracraft was unable to participate in the pre-draft process and ultimately went unselected in the 2017 NFL Draft and was not initially signed by any team as an undrafted free agent. He worked out for the New England Patriots in September 2017 following a season-ending injury to Julian Edelman, but was not offered a contract by the team. Cracraft was signed by the Denver Broncos to the team's practice squad on October 17, 2017 but was released by the team three days later after sustaining an injury in practice. He was subsequently re-signed to the Broncos' practice squad later on in the season on December 18, 2017 and signed a futures contract with the team at the end of the season.

Cracraft was signed to the Broncos' practice squad after being cut from the team's active roster at the end of the 2018 preseason. He was cut from the practice squad on September 10, 2018 to make room for previously suspended wide receiver Carlos Henderson, but was re-signed on September 19. Cracraft was promoted to the Broncos active roster on November 2, 2018 and made his NFL debut two days later in the Broncos' 19-17 loss to the Houston Texans, returning a punt for five yards. He caught his first career pass, a 44-yard reception, on December 30, 2018 during the Broncos final game of the season against the Los Angeles Chargers. He finished the season with one reception for 44 yards, 12 punts returned for 40 yards (3.3 yards per return) and three kickoffs returned for 43 yards (14.3 yards per return) in eight games played.

On September 1, 2019, Cracraft was waived by the Broncos after making the initial roster out of training camp. Cracraft was re-signed by the Broncos on September 11, 2019. He was waived on September 24, 2019.

Philadelphia Eagles
On December 24, 2019, Cracraft was signed to the Philadelphia Eagles practice squad. He signed a reserve/future contract with the Eagles on January 6, 2020. He was later waived on April 30, 2020.

Cracraft had a tryout with the Arizona Cardinals on August 14, 2020.

San Francisco 49ers 
Cracraft was signed by the 49ers on August 27, 2020. He was waived on September 5, 2020, and signed to the practice squad the next day. He was elevated to the active roster on October 31 and November 5 for the team's weeks 8 and 9 games against the Seattle Seahawks and Green Bay Packers, and reverted to the practice squad after each game. He was then promoted to the active roster on November 9. Cracraft finished the season with six receptions for 41 yards with five punt returns for 40 yards and three tackles on special teams.

On February 22, 2021, Cracraft signed a one-year contract extension with the 49ers. He was waived on August 24, 2021, but re-signed four days later. He was waived on August 31, 2021 and re-signed to the practice squad the next day. He was promoted to the active roster on December 11. He was waived on January 29, 2022.

Miami Dolphins 
Cracraft was signed by the Dolphins on February 17, 2022. He was waived by the Dolphins on August 30, 2022 and re-signed to the practice squad. Cracraft was elevated to the active roster on September 11, 2022, for the team's season opener against the New England Patriots. He was elevated the following week In the 4th quarter of week 2, Cracraft caught a two yard touchdown pass from Tua Tagovailoa, the first of his career. The touchdown helped spark the Dolphins' 21 point comeback over the Baltimore Ravens in a 42-38 victory. In week 3, against the Buffalo Bills, Cracraft caught a 11 yard touchdown for his second on the season, helping the Dolphins go 3-0 for the first time since the 2018 season. He was signed to the active roster on September 29.

On March 17, 2023, Cracraft re-signed with the Dolphins.

NFL career statistics

Personal life
Cracraft's older brother, Skyler, walked on to the Cougars as a safety after River committed to the team despite not having played organized football since high school two years prior. Both of his parents are named Tracy; his father played baseball at Taft College.

References

External links
Washington State Cougars bio
Denver Broncos bio

1994 births
Living people
People from Rancho Santa Margarita, California
Sportspeople from Orange County, California
Players of American football from California
American football wide receivers
American football return specialists
Washington State Cougars football players
Denver Broncos players
Philadelphia Eagles players
San Francisco 49ers players
Miami Dolphins players